Periodic acid–Schiff–diastase (PAS-D, PAS diastase) stain is a periodic acid–Schiff (PAS) stain used in combination with diastase, an enzyme that breaks down glycogen. PAS-D is a stain often used by pathologists as an ancillary study in making a histologic diagnosis on paraffin-embedded tissue specimens. PAS stain typically gives a magenta color in the presence of glycogen. When PAS and diastase are used together, a light pink color replaces the deep magenta. Differences in the intensities of the two stains (PAS and PAS-D) can be attributed to different glycogen concentrations and can be used to semiquantify glycogen in samples.  In practice, the tissue is deparaffinized, the diastase incubates, and then the PAS stain is applied.

An example of PAS-D in use is in showing gastric/duodenal metaplasia in duodenal adenomas. PAS diastase stain is also used to identify alpha-1 antitrypsin globules in hepatocytes, which is a characteristic finding of alpha-1 antitrypsin deficiency.
PAS diastase stain is also used in diagnosing Whipple’s disease, as the foamy macrophages that infiltrate the lamina propria of the small intestine in this disease possess PAS-positive, diastase-resistant inclusions.

Additional images

See also
Periodic acid-Schiff stain
Diastase

References

External links
PAS Diastase Protocol

Staining